The New York Jets are a professional American football team based in the New York metropolitan area. The Jets compete in the National Football League (NFL) as a member club of the league's American Football Conference (AFC) East division. The team is headquartered in Florham Park, New Jersey. The franchise is legally organized as a limited liability company under the name New York Jets, LLC.

The team began play in 1960 at the Polo Grounds. Under new ownership, the current name was adopted in 1963 and the franchise moved to Shea Stadium in 1964 and then to the Meadowlands Sports Complex in 1984. The Jets advanced to the playoffs for the first time in 1968 and went on to compete in Super Bowl III where they defeated the Baltimore Colts, becoming the first AFL team to defeat an NFL club in an AFL–NFL World Championship Game. Since 1968, the Jets have appeared in the playoffs 13 times, and in the AFC Championship Game four times, most recently losing to the Pittsburgh Steelers in 2010. However, the Jets have never returned to the Super Bowl, making them one of two NFL teams to win their lone Super Bowl appearance, along with the New Orleans Saints, and making them one of four teams (along with the Cleveland Browns, Jacksonville Jaguars, and Houston Texans) to never win an AFC championship. Apart from the Browns and the Detroit Lions, who have never reached the Super Bowl (although both won NFL championships prior to 1966), the Jets' drought is the longest among current NFL franchises and they are historically among the less successful franchises.

The team's training facility, Atlantic Health Jets Training Center, which opened in 2008, is located in Florham Park.

Franchise history

The first organizational meeting of the American Football League took place on August 14, 1959. Harry Wismer, representing the city of New York at the meeting, proclaimed the state was ready for another professional football team and that he was more than capable of running the daily operations.

Wismer was granted the charter franchise later dubbed the Titans of New York as Wismer explained, "Titans are bigger and stronger than Giants." He secured the Titans' home field at the decrepit Polo Grounds, where the team struggled financially and on the field during its first three years. By 1962, the debt continued to mount for Wismer, forcing the AFL to assume the costs of the team until season's end.

A five-man syndicate, headed by Sonny Werblin, saved the team from certain bankruptcy, purchasing the lowly Titans for $1 million in 1963. Werblin renamed the team the New York Jets since the team would play near LaGuardia Airport and because it rhymed with the New York Mets as they would be playing in Shea Stadium. The new name was intended to reflect the modern approach of his team. The Jets' owners hired Weeb Ewbank as the general manager and head coach. Ewbank and quarterback Joe Namath led the Jets to prominence in 1969, when New York defeated the heavily favored Baltimore Colts in Super Bowl III and solidified the AFL's position in the world of professional football.

When the AFL and NFL merged, the team fell into a state of mediocrity along with their star quarterback, Namath, who only had three successful post-merger seasons after injuries hampered much of his career. The Jets continued to spiral downward before enjoying a string of successes in the 1980s, which included an appearance in the 1982 AFC Championship Game, and the emergence of the popular New York Sack Exchange.

The early 1990s saw the team struggling. After firing coach Bruce Coslet, owner Leon Hess hired Pete Carroll who struggled to a 6–10 record and was promptly fired at the end of the season. Thereafter, Rich Kotite was selected to lead the team to victory; instead he led the Jets to a 4–28 record over the next two years. Kotite stepped down at the end of his second season forcing the Jets to search for a new head coach.

Hess lured then-disgruntled New England Patriots head coach Bill Parcells to New York in 1997. Parcells led the team back to relevance and coached them to the AFC Championship Game in 1998. Hess died in 1999 while the team, plagued by injuries, produced an eight win record, falling short of a playoff berth. At the end of the season, Parcells stepped down as head coach deferring control to his assistant, Bill Belichick; Belichick resigned the very next day (leaving a napkin at the stage for his introduction, on which he had written "I resign as HC of the NYJ") and went on to accept the head coaching position with the Patriots.

The franchise obtained a new owner in Woody Johnson in 2000. Additionally, through the 2000s the Jets visited the playoffs five times, a franchise record, under the direction of three coaches. Rex Ryan was hired in January 2009. In the draft that year the Jets would take USC quarterback Mark Sanchez with the fifth overall pick with the intent of making him the franchise centerpiece. Ryan and Sanchez led the team to back-to-back AFC Championship Game appearances during their first two years, but the team never made the playoffs again during their tenure. After a 4–12 season in 2014, Sanchez was released, while Ryan and general manager John Idzik were fired.

Championships

AFL championships

Super Bowl championships

Division championships

Ownership

Harry Wismer
Harry Wismer, a businessman, had been interested in sports for much of his life when he was granted a charter franchise in the American Football League. Wismer was a three-sport letterman in high school, and went on to play football for the University of Florida and Michigan State University before a knee injury ended his playing career. Undeterred, Wismer began his career as a broadcaster with Michigan State and became a pioneer of the industry. Later, as the Titans owner, Wismer formulated a league-wide policy which allowed broadcasting rights to be shared equally among the teams.

Wismer, who had previously had a 25% stake in the Washington Redskins, was interested in the American Football League and was given a franchise to develop in New York. Wismer, whose philosophy was who you knew mattered most, tried to make the team and the league a success. His efforts began to accrue debt as the Titans' first two seasons were mediocre with attendance dropping in the team's second year. The franchise was sold for $1 million to a five-man syndicate headed by Sonny Werblin of the Gotham Football Club, Inc., in February 1963.

Sonny Werblin syndicate
Sonny Werblin graduated from Rutgers University and was employed by the Music Corporation of America, eventually becoming president of the company's television division. With a vast knowledge of media, Werblin was determined to put the spotlight on the team. His first order of business, after changing the team's name and jerseys, was to sign Joe Namath to an unprecedented contract. Werblin's gamble would later pay off as Namath, who became a public star, led the Jets on to victory in Super Bowl III, though by then Werblin had sold his stake in the team.

Werblin's partners, Townsend B. Martin, Leon Hess, Donald C. Lillis, and Philip H. Iselin, had a falling out with Werblin over the way the team was run—though the franchise had begun to make a profit, Werblin was making all the policies and decisions himself with little or no input from his partners, much to their dismay. Though Werblin initially resisted their ultimatum to dissolve the partnership, Werblin agreed to be bought out in 1968. Werblin remained involved in the sports community and became the first chairman and CEO of the New Jersey Sports and Exposition Authority where he helped to create the Meadowlands Sports Complex, including Giants Stadium.

Leon Hess
Leon Hess became well known for his Hess Corporation gas stations; however, he also played an instrumental part in the development of the Jets during his tenure as co-owner and eventual sole owner. Hess had often fought for improvements while the team was a tenant at Shea Stadium but generally stayed away from football operations, allowing his coaches and general manager to make football-related decisions.

Becoming the team's majority stockholder in 1973, Hess bought Philip H. Iselin's share upon his death in 1976 after which only two of Hess' partners remained, Townsend Martin and Helen Dillon, who had inherited the stake from her father Donald Lillis, upon his death. Hess began to buy out the remaining partners in 1981 when he bought Martin's 25% stake for $5 million. Hess bought Dillon's stake three years later for another $5 million, acquiring sole control of the team.

Hess had a passion for his team and took losses hard. In 1995, following a mediocre 6–10 season under Pete Carroll, despite generally shying away from football operations, Hess announced "I'm 80 years old, I want results now" during a conference in which Rich Kotite was introduced as the team's new coach. After two unsuccessful years with Kotite, Hess heavily involved himself in hiring Bill Parcells in hopes to see his team again reach the Super Bowl. He did not live to see his dream realized, dying on May 7, 1999.

Woody Johnson
With the team for sale, two potential buyers were found in Cablevision and philanthropist Woody Johnson whose grandfather, Robert Wood Johnson II, expanded Johnson & Johnson. Johnson was unknown among the other NFL owners at the time of his $635 million purchase of the franchise. However, Johnson had a passion for sports according to former Knicks general manager Ernie Grunfeld and desired to own his own team. Johnson has been considered to be an enabler who wants the best from his employees.

Much like Hess, Johnson left many of the football related decisions up to his management team and tended to avoid the spotlight. However, upon hiring head coach Rex Ryan, Johnson had an increased presence as he molded the Jets into his team.

Christopher Johnson
In 2017, Woody Johnson was appointed by President Donald Trump as the United States Ambassador to the United Kingdom. Once his post was confirmed, his brother Christopher Johnson became a co-owner and took over the day-to-day operations for the team, including personnel decisions. Woody Johnson's term as ambassador ended in 2021, and he took over ownership duties from Christopher.

Stadiums

Owner Harry Wismer sought out a place for the team to play their home games but was only able to secure the dilapidated Polo Grounds, which had not had a major tenant since the baseball New York Giants vacated the stadium in 1957. The Titans played their first four seasons at the stadium—in the final season they were renamed the Jets. The Titans shared the stadium with baseball's new expansion team, the New York Mets, for two years before both teams moved to Shea Stadium in Queens in 1964. The Jets hold the distinction of being the final team to host a game at the Polo Grounds, a 19–10 loss to the Buffalo Bills on December 14, 1963.

Wismer hoped the Titans could play in what would become known as Shea Stadium beginning in 1961. However, funding difficulties and legal problems delayed construction of the stadium. Wismer signed a memorandum of understanding in late 1961 to secure the Titans' new home. That memorandum recognized that the Mets would have exclusive use of the stadium until they had completed their season. As the team moved to Shea under new ownership, they were, in most years, required to open the season with several road games, a problem made worse in 1969 and 1973 when the Mets had long playoff runs.

Feeling that this arrangement put the Jets at a disadvantage, the team announced in 1977 that they would play two home games a year during the month of September at the Giants' new home in New Jersey, Giants Stadium. Litigation began between New York City and the Jets over the issue, and in the lawsuit's settlement, the city agreed to allow the Jets to play two September home games a season at Shea beginning in 1978 for the remaining six years in the Jets' lease. In 1977, the Jets were to play one September game at Giants Stadium and an October 2 game at Shea.

In spite of these issues, majority owner Leon Hess was interested in renewing the team's lease at Shea, which was due to expire in 1983. Hess negotiated with New York mayor Ed Koch. Hess wanted the city to redevelop the stadium to expand its capacity. He also hoped to renegotiate other aspects of the lease—the Jets received no money from ticketholders parking at Shea. Hess's proposals met resistance from Koch. When negotiations reached an impasse, the Jets announced their intention to depart for New Jersey. On December 10, 1983, the Jets played their final game at Shea and lost to the Steelers 34–7. As fans pillaged the stadium for mementos, the scoreboard read "N.J. Jets" in reference to the Jets' departure to the Meadowlands.

When the Jets joined the Giants at the stadium, many Jets fans hoped the name, Giants Stadium, would be changed. However, the Giants, who had the authority to approve the change, refused. In an effort to conceal the fact that they played in a stadium built and decorated for another team, the stadium grounds crew was assigned to make the stadium more Jet-friendly during Jets games by putting up green banners and placing the Jets' logo over the Giants'. No change could be made to the blue and red seating bowl. The Jets were featured in the first NFL playoff game in the stadium's history, falling to the Patriots on December 28, 1985.

As the Jets sought to become a stronger franchise and remove themselves from their counterparts' shadow, the team entered into negotiations with the Metropolitan Transportation Authority in an attempt to build a stadium on the west side of Manhattan, entering a bidding war with TransGas Energy Systems and Cablevision for the rights to the West Side Yard property—Hess, prior to his death, had been approached by former mayor Rudy Giuliani about bringing the team to the West Side when their lease at Giants Stadium expired in 2008. Cablevision was fixated against the Jets owning the land as Madison Square Garden, located only a few blocks away, would be forced to compete with the stadium. Team owners had voted, 31–1, with the Buffalo Bills the only objectors, to award the 2010 Super Bowl to New York contingent on the Jets winning the bid and completing construction of the stadium prior to 2010.

The MTA unanimously voted to sell the land to the Jets for approximately $210 million as the committee agreed that having the stadium would be beneficial in the long run. An angry Cablevision, community groups and transportation advocates were determined to derail the Jets' attempts at building the stadium and two lawsuits challenging the construction of the stadium on environmental grounds were filed.

Although confident they could secure the stadium, their hopes were dashed when Sheldon Silver and Joseph L. Bruno, both of whom held veto power over the stadium construction, refused to support the project, alleging it would hurt rather than help the development of the West Side.

Defeated, the Jets agreed to enter a 50–50 joint venture with their rival, the Giants, to build a new stadium effectively agreeing to a 99-year lease, which the Giants had signed earlier in the year, to remain in New Jersey. The stadium, known as MetLife Stadium, became the first in the history of the NFL to be jointly built by two franchises. The stadium, which is illuminated in different colors depending on which team is hosting a game, opened in April 2010 and saw the Jets and Giants open the stadium together in a preseason exhibition game. The Jets' first regular season home game at the new stadium was held on September 13, 2010 and was shown nationwide on Monday Night Football. New York lost to the Ravens 10–9. Team owners voted to have the stadium host Super Bowl XLVIII, held in 2014.

Rivalries

New England Patriots

Since the inception of the American Football League, the Jets have maintained what is considered to be a marquee rivalry with the New England Patriots. The rivalry was relatively docile in its early years until 1966 when the Jets removed the Patriots, who had hopes of appearing in Super Bowl I, from playoff contention with a 38–28 defeat at Shea Stadium. The Patriots returned the favor in 1985 when the Jets lost to New England 26–14 in the wild card round; the Patriots went on to Super Bowl XX where they were defeated by the Bears.

The rivalry began to escalate and receive increased media attention in 1997 when a disgruntled Bill Parcells vacated his head coaching position with New England to accept the same position with New York Jets. The following year, the Jets signed Pro Bowl running back Curtis Martin from the Patriots. After the Jets declined during Parcells' third year, Parcells decided to resign as head coach. His assistant, Bill Belichick, was installed as the new head coach but suddenly resigned the next day at a press conference, just one day after accepting the position, to become the new head coach of the Patriots instead. His decision was influenced by the passing of the team owner, Leon Hess, before the '99 season, who at one point was offering Belichick a $1 million bonus to stay put. However, Belichick had not spoken to the two potential new owners, Woody Johnson and Charles Dolan, and had issues with both because the original agreement with Hess was no longer there; "the whole ownership configuration at that point in time was a major factor in my decision much more than a personal relationship."

A critical turning point of the rivalry took place on September 23, 2001 when Jets linebacker Mo Lewis tackled Drew Bledsoe, leaving the veteran with internal bleeding. This provided an opportunity for Tom Brady to take over as the starting quarterback and during his tenure, Brady successfully guided New England to six Super Bowl titles. In 2006, Eric Mangini, an assistant under Belichick, left New England to join the Jets as their head coach. Under Mangini, the famous Spygate incident took place, further escalating tensions between both clubs. When Rex Ryan was hired as the team's head coach, the rivalry further escalated due to an increased war of words between both teams. In January 2011, the two met in a Divisional Round playoff game. The visiting Jets pulled a 28–21 upset to advance to the AFC Championship Game, which they ultimately lost one week later to the Pittsburgh Steelers.

Buffalo Bills

The Jets and the Bills represent the same state (New York), and this rivalry represents the differences between New York City and Western New York, where the Bills play. The teams are both charter members of the American Football League and have generally stayed in the same division since, even after the NFL and AFL merged. Aside from a few notable moments, such as O. J. Simpson breaking an NFL rushing record against the Jets, a playoff game in 1981, and ex-Jets coach Rex Ryan coaching the Bills for two years, the rivalry has otherwise been characterized by shared mediocrity and uncompetitive games, including notable blunders by quarterbacks Mark Sanchez of the Jets, and J. P. Losman of the Bills. However, in recent years, the series has heated up again due to a friendly rivalry between quarterbacks Sam Darnold and Josh Allen, who were selected in the first round of the 2018 draft.

Miami Dolphins

New York has maintained a rivalry with the Miami Dolphins since the Dolphins' inception in 1966. The Jets' best chance to reach the Super Bowl after the Super Bowl III victory was thwarted by A.J. Duhe in 1983 whose interception return for touchdown on a rain-soaked field in the conference championship game was the decisive score. One of the most famous games in Jets history took place in 1994 when the Dolphins ran the Fake Spike play, giving them an improbable victory and halting the Jets' momentum that season, serving as a precursor to the Jets' next two unsuccessful years under Rich Kotite. The Jets went on to complete an improbable victory of their own on October 23, 2000 in what is known as The Monday Night Miracle. The Jets, trailing the Dolphins 30–7 at the end of the third quarter, rallied in the fourth quarter scoring 23 unanswered points, eventually winning in overtime with a 40-yard John Hall kick.

When Rex Ryan became New York's head coach, there was an increased war of words between the clubs culminating with Ryan flashing an obscene gesture to heckling Dolphins fans in January 2010. The rivalry continued between both teams when Sal Alosi, then the strength and conditioning coach of the Jets, tripped Dolphins cornerback Nolan Carroll. Carroll was not seriously injured and Alosi resigned nearly two months later.

New York Giants

The New York Jets previously maintained a high tension rivalry against their in-town counterparts, the New York Giants, that has since diminished due to the infrequency with which the teams meet in the regular season. The pinnacle of the rivalry came on August 17, 1969 when both the Jets and Giants met for the first time, in a preseason game which was viewed as a "turf war" by both opponents. The Giants, considered a mediocre team at the time, were regarded as underdogs and were under much scrutiny by the media and their fans. Ultimately, the Jets bested their rival 37–14; this would result in the firing of Giants coach Allie Sherman.

The Jets met the Giants in 1988 during the final game of the regular season. The Jets, with a 7–7–1 record, had little to lose as their hopes for playoff contention had vanished. The Giants, however, were contending for a playoff spot (they were 10–5 at that point) and a victory would have secured their spot and their division title. Although the six point favorites, the Giants were unable to overcome the Jets defense which sacked Giants quarterback Phil Simms eight times. With the Jets' victory and victories by the Rams and Eagles, the Giants were eliminated from playoff contention and the Jets gained respect in the eyes of many.

In spite of the big sibling rivalry that has resulted in trash talk between the players, both teams have formed an unexpected and consequently strong partnership sharing Giants Stadium for 26 years and MetLife Stadium, a venture in which both teams own a 50% share of the stadium. The rivalry regained much of its tension in the 2011 NFL season when the Jets and Giants met in Week 16. Both teams needed a victory to keep their playoffs hope alive and there was significant trash talk between Rex Ryan and his players and many of the Giants in the weeks leading up to the game. Ryan and Giants running back Brandon Jacobs reportedly came close to blows after the game, a 29–14 win by the Giants. The two teams met again on December 6, 2015, with the Jets coming from behind and winning 23–20 in overtime. The teams met again in 2019, with the Jets taking the win 34–27.

Logos and uniforms

The Jets redesigned their uniforms and primary logo for the 2019 season. The new team colors are a medium green that the franchise calls "Gotham Green," white, and black. The primary logo is a green football-shaped oval outlined in white, oriented horizontally, with the word "JETS" in thick, sans-serif italics positioned just below the horizontal axis with "NEW YORK" above it in smaller letters, and a miniature football graphic at bottom center partially covering the lower portion of the "E" and "T".

The primary uniform consists of green jerseys with white numerals and white jerseys with green numerals, green and white pants, and green socks. The numerals are in a new sans-serif block-style font and have thin black outlines, with "NEW YORK" in thick sans-serif italics above the numerals on the front, TV numerals on the upper shoulders, and the player's name in sans-serif block letters on the back, in either green or white. The jerseys have opposite-colored stripes around the shoulder that taper toward the collar, and the pants have opposite-colored stripes on each side that taper toward the lower thigh. The team also has a black alternate uniform with white numerals outlined in green, green stripes and black socks.

The helmet is a deep metallic emerald green with a black facemask; the decal on each side is a secondary logo, consisting of the primary logo's "JETS" wordmark and football graphic.

The team's original uniforms, as the Titans of New York in 1960, were navy blue with old gold numerals, gold pants with two parallel blue stripes on each side, and navy blue helmets with a single gold stripe down the center and no logo decals. The white jerseys had navy blue numerals. In 1961, the Titans added UCLA-style shoulder stripes (gold and white on the blue jerseys, gold and navy blue on the white jerseys), changed the pants striping to a blue stripe flanked by white stripes, and employed a somewhat brighter shade of gold.

When the Titans became the Jets in 1963, navy and gold were abandoned in favor of kelly green and white. The jerseys had opposite-colored sleeves with thick stripes on the shoulders and cuffs, above and below the TV numerals. The pants were white with two parallel green stripes on each side. The new helmets were white with a single green stripe down the center; the logo on each side was a silhouette of a jet airplane in green, with the word "JETS" in thick white sans-serif italics along the fuselage. In 1964, the single green stripe became two parallel stripes, and the jet-plane decal was replaced with a white football shape outlined in green, with the word "JETS" in thick green sans-serif italics in front of "NY" in green outline serif lettering, and a miniature football at bottom center. The decals were difficult to see from a distance (or on television), so the colors were reversed in 1965.

This design remained largely unchanged through 1977, apart from some variations to the numeral and lettering typefaces, the angle of the helmet decals, and adjustments to the shoulder and sleeve striping due to changes in NFL jersey tailoring and materials.

The Jets' first major design change was made for the 1978 season. The kelly green and white color scheme was retained; the new helmets were solid green with white facemasks, and a stylized "JETS" wordmark in white on each side. The mark featured angular lettering and a silhouette of a modern jet airplane extending horizontally to the right from the top of the "J" above the "ETS". The jerseys featured large TV numerals on the shoulders and two thick parallel stripes on the sleeves, while the pants had a single green stripe from hip to knee on each side. In 1990, the Jets modified this design by adding thin black outlines to the numerals, lettering, stripes and helmet decals, changing the facemasks from white to black, and adding a set of green pants to be worn with the white jerseys.

The Jets were the first NFL team to wear a "throwback" uniform, in 1993 for a home game against the Cincinnati Bengals celebrating the 25th anniversary of the 1968 championship team. The jersey and pants mimicked the 1963–77 design, although the team wore its regular green helmets with a white-outlined version of the 1965–77 logo decal. In 1994, as part of the NFL's 75th Anniversary celebration, the Jets wore both home and road versions of this uniform in select games, again using their regular green helmets with the 1965–77 logo but with two parallel white stripes down the center.

The Jets adopted a new uniform and logo design in 1998, a modernization of the 1960s–1970s set. Green pants were added in 2002, and have been worn with both the white and green jerseys.

In 2007, the team introduced a new "throwback" uniform, evoking the original Titans of New York and combining elements of the 1960 and 1961–62 uniforms, with navy blue helmets and jerseys, old gold numerals and helmet stripes, gold and white shoulder stripes, and gold pants with blue and white stripes on each side. These uniforms appeared again in 2008, 2009 and 2011, with a white jersey variation also appearing in 2009 as part of the NFL's celebration of the American Football League's 50th anniversary.

The Jets unveiled new jerseys and an updated logo for the 2019 season. The jerseys are colored "Gotham Green" for home and "Spotlight White" for away. They also reintroduced black as a team color for the first time since 1997.

Cheerleading squad

The original Jets Flag Crew was established in 2006. In 2007, the group underwent an expansion and was renamed the Jets Flight Crew. The squad regularly performs choreographed routines during the team's home contests. Auditions have been held annually since their inception to attract new members.

The Jets Junior Flight Crew was established in 2010, offering children the opportunity to train with the Flight Crew while improving their "talent and abilities in a non-competitive environment."

Radio and television

The Jets' current flagship radio station is WEPN 98.7 ESPN with Bob Wischusen as the play-by-play announcer and former Jet Marty Lyons, of the Sack Exchange, as the color analyst.

Any preseason games not nationally televised are shown on WCBS-TV. SportsNet New York, which serves as the official home of the Jets, airs over 250 hours of "exclusive, in depth" material on the team in high definition.

Monday Night Football games are televised in a simulcast with ESPN by either sister station WABC-TV, or WPIX-TV if WABC chooses to waive the game to another station to carry regularly scheduled programming. Thursday Night Football carriage of a Jets game is incumbent on the producing network for that game (on FOX), which is also simulcast by NFL Network.

Season-by-season record
This is a partial list of the Jets' last five completed seasons. For the full season-by-season franchise results, see List of New York Jets seasons.

Note: The Finish, Wins, Losses, and Ties columns list regular season results and exclude any postseason play.

As of January 3, 2021

Players

Current roster

Pro Football Hall of Famers

Ewbank, Hill, Martin, Mawae, Maynard, and Namath are recognized based upon their achievements with the Jets. Ewbank is also recognized based upon his achievements with the Baltimore Colts, coaching them to NFL championships in 1958 and 1959. Riggins is recognized primarily for his seasons with the Washington Redskins (1976–1979, 1981–1985), as is Monk (1980–1993), who won three Super Bowl championships with Washington. Lott is in the Hall of Fame primarily for his exploits as a member of the San Francisco 49ers. Baugh and Turner are recognized based upon their achievements as players with other teams, rather than their head coaching stints with the Jets. While Parcells reversed the fortunes of the Jets, he had major impact for the New York Giants, coaching them to two Super Bowl victories. Wolf only had a brief stint with the Jets between 1990 and 1991, while most of his major contributions occurred as an executive and player personnel director with the Oakland Raiders (1963–1974, 1979–1989), and later as General Manager of the Green Bay Packers (1991–2001). Favre only played one season as a member of the Jets in 2008, between most of his career with the Packers (1992–2007) and his last two NFL seasons with the Minnesota Vikings (2009–2010).

Retired numbers

Additionally, the Jets have not reissued the #80 jersey of Wayne Chrebet (WR, 1995–2005) since he suffered a career-ending concussion in the 2005 season, and it has long been understood that it will not be worn again in the foreseeable future. Along similar lines, Byrd's #90 had not been reissued since he suffered a career-ending neck injury in 1992, and it had been understood long before his number was formally retired that no Jet would ever wear it again. Further, the Jets have not reissued #24 since the release of Darrelle Revis in 2016.

Ring of Honor
The Jets established a Ring of Honor on July 20, 2010, to commemorate former players. Each season, players will be nominated by an internal committee and then inducted into the Ring. There is no specific amount of honorees to be selected each year.

American Football League All-Time Team
The following Titans/Jets were selected to the American Football League All-Time Team on January 14, 1970. The first and second teams were determined by a panel of members of the AFL's Hall of Fame Board of Selectors: Bold indicates those elected to the Pro Football Hall of Fame.

All-Time Four Decade Team

New York announced their official All-Time Four Decade team in 2003, which was determined by the fans of the team. Bold indicates those elected to the Pro Football Hall of Fame.

Notable first-round draft picks

Perhaps the most famous of the Jets' first round picks came in 1965 when they selected Alabama quarterback Joe Namath who boosted the Jets into the national spotlight with his boisterous personality and lifestyle. His physical talents on the field helped improve the Jets' fortunes, leading them to victory over the Baltimore Colts in Super Bowl III. Though injuries hampered the latter part of Namath's career, he is best remembered, according to former teammate John Dockery, as "a guy that came along and broke a lot of the conventions." Namath was inducted into the Hall of Fame in 1985.

The Jets have had a history of selecting players who turned out to be draft busts. Perhaps one of the most disappointing players in Jets history was running back Blair Thomas. Thomas, who averaged 5.4 yards per carry at Penn State, was an intriguing prospect the Jets were interested in utilizing to help their cumbersome offense. Confident in their decision, the Jets drafted Thomas with the second overall pick in 1990, expecting him to be a solid player for years to come. Thomas ran for only 620 yards in 1990, and failed to meet the high expectations. By the time Thomas left the team as an unrestricted free agent in 1993, he had rushed for 2,009 yards and only five touchdowns. The 2008 first round pick, outside linebacker Vernon Gholston, followed a similar path, failing to record a sack during his three-year tenure with the team.
Kyle Brady in 1995, who was drafted ahead of Warren Sapp, one of many disappointments during Rich Kotite's tenure as coach. However, in the same draft, the Jets did better with Hugh Douglas. Dewayne Robertson was a fourth overall selection in 2003 by the Jets. The defensive tackle out of Kentucky failed to make a big impact with the team. He accounted for 14.5 sacks in his 5 seasons with the team, a rather underwhelming player given what the Jets had hoped for. At quarterback, the Jets found themselves dealing with the consequences of drafting University of Alabama quarterback Richard Todd in 1976. In his tenure with the Jets, he threw for more interceptions than he did touchdowns. In the '81 season, the Jets played vs the Miami Dolphins in the AFC Championship Game. Todd threw for 5 interceptions and the Jets lost the game. A year later, Todd would be traded to the New Orleans Saints. The most recent bust, Dee Milliner, was drafted by the team in 2013. Milliner played his college career at the University of Alabama and had high expectations after being drafted. Lasting just 3 years with the team, Milliner's career was plagued by injuries and inconsistency, recording only 3 interceptions during his brief Jets career.

In the 2013 and 2014 seasons, one of the Jets' strongest units was their defensive line, manned by 1st Round selections Muhammad Wilkerson (2011) and Sheldon Richardson (2013). In 2013, Wilkerson ended the season with 10.5 sacks, matching the last Jets player to have more than 10 sacks in a single season, John Abraham in 2005. Also that year, Richardson was honored with an award from the AP for Defensive Rookie of the Year. The Jets' run defense was stout with all three in the line up, finishing fifth as a team in rushing yards allowed in 2014.

In the 2017 NFL Draft, the Jets selected Jamal Adams with the sixth overall pick out of LSU. Adams had a strong start to his early career, making the Pro Bowl in the 2018 season and winning the Defensive MVP Award alongside Kansas City Chiefs' quarterback Patrick Mahomes as the Offensive MVP.

In the 2019 NFL Draft, the Jets selected Quinnen Williams from Alabama with the third overall pick. Williams had been touted as the best overall prospect leading up to the draft, being compared to defensive tackle superstar Aaron Donald. Williams ended up being the final first-round pick by then general manager Mike Maccagnan, who was fired shortly after the draft. Williams struggled in his rookie year with injuries and inconsistent play, but showed promise as a defensive anchor in his 2020 season: he recorded 7.0 sacks and 55 total tackles before being added to the Injured Reserved list in the final weeks of the season.

In the 2022 NFL Draft, the Jets made three selections in the first round. The Jets selected cornerback Sauce Gardner from the University of Cincinnati fourth overall. He made the 2022 All-Pro Team as a rookie, the first to do so at his position since Ronnie Lott in 1981. The second of their three first round selections was wide receiver Garrett Wilson from Ohio State, who was selected 10th overall. The Jets third and final selection in the first round was defensive end Jermaine Johnson II of Florida State University.

Coaches and staff

Head coaches

Current staff

References

Notes

Bibliography

External links

 
 New York Jets at the National Football League official website

 
American Football League teams
National Football League teams
American football teams in New Jersey
Jets
American football teams in the New York metropolitan area
Sports in East Rutherford, New Jersey
American football teams established in 1960
1960 establishments in New York City